Lipotriches bombayensis is a species of bee in the genus Lipotriches, of the family Halictidae.

See also

References

Halictidae
Insects of India
Hymenoptera of Asia
Insects described in 1908